A Woman Possessed is a low budget 1958 British drama film directed by Max Varnel and starring Margaretta Scott, Francis Matthews, and Kay Callard.

Plot
John Winthrop, an English doctor, returns from a trip to America with his new fiancee, Ann. He is met with disapproval from his wealthy, domineering mother, Katherine, who is vocal in her dislike of Ann. On discovering Ann has a heart condition, Katherine insists the couple move in with her. One day the mother accidentally gives her daughter-in-law the wrong medication and Ann nearly dies. The doctor saves his wife; but then accuses his mother of attempted murder. In the end, it turns out Emma the maid was responsible for accidentally switching the pills, and with the crisis over, mother, son and daughter-in-law realise they must settle the differences between them.

Cast
Margaretta Scott - Katherine Winthrop	
Francis Matthews - John Winthrop
Kay Callard - Ann	
Alison Leggatt - Emma
Ian Fleming - Walter
Jan Holden - Mary
Tony Thawnton - Calvin 
Denis Shaw - Bishop 
Totti Truman Taylor - Miss Frobisher
Edith Savile - Lady Harriett

Critical reception
TV Guide comments that "despite some good performances from the cast, this isn't a very engaging drama."

References

External links

1958 films
1950s English-language films